A union catalog is a combined library catalog describing the collections of a number of libraries. Union catalogs have been created in a range of media, including book format, microform, cards and more recently, networked electronic databases. Print union catalogs are typically arranged by title, author or subject (often employing a controlled vocabulary); electronic versions typically support keyword and Boolean queries. Union catalogs are useful to librarians, as they assist in locating and requesting materials from other libraries through interlibrary loan service. They also allow researchers to search through collections to which they would not otherwise have access, such as manuscript collections.

The largest union catalog ever printed is the American National Union Catalog Pre-1956 Imprints (NUC), completed in 1981. This achievement has since been superseded by the creation of union catalogs in the form of electronic databases, of which the largest is OCLC's WorldCat. Another example is COPAC provided by Research Libraries UK, which was superseded by Library Hub Discover in 2019. A third example is AMICUS, provided by Library and Archives Canada.

For academic publications, several academic search engines exist to combine the open data provided by open archives through OAI-PMH, as well as records from publishers deposited in CrossRef and other sources. They include BASE, CORE and Unpaywall, which indexes over 20 million open access publications as of 2020.

See also 
 OAIster
 SUNCAT
 Trove

References 

Library catalogues